Mason Deeds (born August 3, 1998) is an American college soccer player who plays for Pennsylvania State University.

Career

Club
Deeds joined the New York Red Bulls Academy in 2013. During the 2015 season, he trained with the first team.

On June 6, 2015, Deeds made his debut for USL club New York Red Bulls II in a 2–2 draw against FC Montreal.

References

External links
USSF Development Academy bio
Top Drawer Soccer bio

1998 births
Living people
American soccer players
New York Red Bulls II players
Georgetown Hoyas men's soccer players
Penn State Nittany Lions men's soccer players
Association football defenders
Soccer players from Pennsylvania
USL Championship players